The Clark County Council is the legislative body of Clark County, Washington, United States. The county council consists of five members, four elected by district, and one elected at-large.  The Council adopts laws, sets policy, and holds final approval over the budget.

Members

History

The county council was created on November 4, 2014, by Clark County voters as part of a home rule charter, which replaced the traditional three-member county commission with a three-member Board of County Councilors. The council was expanded to five members on January 1, 2016. The county council adopted its current name in January 2018. Clark County was the seventh county in Washington to adopt a home rule charter.

References

External links
Clark County Council

Clark County, Washington
County government in Washington (state)